The Charles Abela Memorial Stadium, also known as the Mosta Ground is a ground situated in Mosta, Malta. It has a total capacity of 700 with 360 seats. The stadium hosts matches from various competitions, most notably the Maltese Third Division and the Women Maltese First Division.

Background and description
The Charles Abela Memorial Stadium was upgraded and inaugurated by then Prime Minister of Malta, Dr Lawrence Gonzi in November 2010. The stadium is named in honour of the late Charles Abela, who was the president of Mosta FC. The stadium comprises one stand, which runs along the whole side of the pitch.

Local issues
In 2011, neighbours complained that some of the works performed on the stadium were illegal In 2016, a player suffered a concussion during a match played at the stadium and the ambulance could not get into the stadium as the keys to the inner gate could not be retrieved.

See also

List of football stadiums in Malta

References

Football venues in Malta
Sport in Mosta
Mosta
Mosta F.C.